Habenaria maitlandii is a species of plant in the family Orchidaceae. It is endemic to Cameroon.  Its natural habitat is subtropical or tropical dry lowland grassland. It is threatened by habitat loss.

References

Endemic orchids of Cameroon
maitlandii
Taxonomy articles created by Polbot
Endangered flora of Africa